Mark Rafailovich Rein (1909–1937?) was a socialist journalist. His father was the Menshevik leader Rafail Abramovich (Rein).

Biography
Mark Rafailovich Rein was born in 1909 in Vilnius, Lithuania (then Vilna in the Russian empire). His father was a prominent leader of the Menshevik faction of the Russian Social-Democratic Workers' Party (RSDRP). In 1911, as a small child, Mark Rein left Russia with his parents, who were escaping from the tsarist police. In 1917 he returned to Russia with his parents; his father played a role in the events of the Revolution of 1917. In 1920, aged 11, Mark Rein left Russia again with his parents. He lived mostly in Berlin and Paris. As a young man he became a member of the Menshevik RSDRP, the German Social Democratic Party and the Swedish Social Democratic Party. In 1932 he graduated from the Berlin Polytechnic. He worked as a journalist for several socialist papers. He was more sympathetic to the Soviet Union than his father, and for a while supported the idea of a unification of social-democratic and communist parties.

In 1936 he went to Spain to support the Republican, anti-fascist forces during the Spanish Civil War. Inter alia, he became a friend to Willy Brandt there, whom he met in Barcelona. On April 9, 1937, he was kidnapped in Barcelona by agents of the Soviet secret service OGPU. He was spirited to Russia, apparently with the intention of using him in the show trial of Alexey Rykov and Nikolai Bukharin. He was supposed to connect the accused in the third Moscow Trial in 1938 to the exiled Menshevik leadership. The kidnapping was apparently organised by A.M. Orlov, who supervised the kidnapping and execution of left-wing opponents of Stalin in Spain during the Civil War and later defected to the USA. In spite of frantic efforts by Rafail Abramovich and western socialist supporters, he was never seen alive again and is thought to have been murdered by the OGPU.

References

Sources
 Papers of Mark Rein. International Institute of Social History.
 Rafail Abramovich Papers. International Institute of Social History.
 'The Case of Mark Rein.' Socialist Appeal Vol. I No. 11 Saturday October 23, 1937.
 Krivitsky, W.G., I Was Stalin's Agent. New York, 1940, p. 193 ff.
 Orlov, A.M., The Secret History of Stalin's Crimes. New York, 1953.

1909 births
1930s deaths
Year of death uncertain
Jews from the Russian Empire
Lithuanian Jews
Russian socialists
Jewish socialists
Mensheviks
Russian journalists
Russian male journalists
Russian Social Democratic Labour Party members
Social Democratic Party of Germany politicians
Great Purge victims from Lithuania
Jews executed by the Soviet Union
Writers from Vilnius
People from Vilensky Uyezd
German male non-fiction writers
20th-century German journalists